"Slug" is a song by Passengers, a side project of rock band U2 and musician Brian Eno. It is the second track on Passengers' only release, the 1995 album Original Soundtracks 1. The track was originally titled "Seibu" and was almost left off the album before it was rediscovered later during the recording sessions. Though Eno made most of the creative decisions during the recording sessions, "Slug" was one of the few tracks that the members from U2 tried to craft themselves.

Lyrically, it is a portrait of a desolate soul during a time of celebration. As Passengers were writing songs for fictional soundtracks, they tried to create a visual suggestion from the music that was more important than the story within the lyrics. In "Slug", the instrumentation is intended to represent the lights turning on in a city at night. The group primarily drew inspiration for the song from U2's experiences in Tokyo at the conclusion of the Zoo TV Tour. "Slug" was praised as one of the best songs on the album by critics from various publications.

Background and recording

U2 and musician Brian Eno intended to record a soundtrack for Peter Greenaway's 1996 film The Pillow Book. Although the plan did not come to fruition, Eno suggested they continue recording music suitable for film soundtracks, as Eno did with his Music for Films album series. The result was Original Soundtracks 1, an experimental album of ambient and electronica music, created as a side project between U2 and Eno under the pseudonym "Passengers". Vocalist Bono felt the visual suggestion from the music was more important than the story told by the lyrics, so the band tried to create visual music when recording.  U2 spent time in Shinjuku, Tokyo, at the end of the Zoo TV Tour in 1993, and their experience in the city influenced the recording sessions. The vivid colours of the street signs and billboards reminded them of the set of the 1982 science-fiction film Blade Runner. Bono has said that Original Soundtracks 1 evoked the setting of a "bullet train in Tokyo".

Recording sessions for Original Soundtracks 1 began with a two-week session in November 1994 at Westside Studios in London, and continued for another five weeks in mid-1995 at Hanover Quay Studios in Dublin.  "Slug" was originally titled "Seibu", after the Japanese department store of the same name.  The song was written to create the visual of lights turning on at dusk in a city like Tokyo, beginning with "tinkling" opening notes resembling Christmas lights, and a gradually rising and falling synthesizer rhythm throughout the song.  After recording "Seibu", the band set it aside, and the piece was forgotten as the sessions progressed. It was almost left off the album, until guitarist the Edge rediscovered the track while looking through the session's discarded songs. Recognizing its potential to become a great song, the Edge brought "Seibu" to Eno's attention, and in early June 1995, Eno listed "Seibu" as a late entry to be considered for the album.

As producer, Eno had most of the artistic control during the sessions, limiting U2's creative input on the recordings, which prompted the Edge to ensure extra work was put into arranging the song. He has said that along with "Miss Sarajevo" and "Your Blue Room", "Seibu" was one of only three tracks from the album in which U2 "really dug in [their] heels and did more work on and tried to craft".  By early July 1995, the band renamed the song "Seibu/Slug", and Eno noted that the piece started to sound better and described it as a "lovely song". During the final editing of the track, Eno became angry with U2 because they seemed unfocused and he felt he was doing all the work. Bono decided to completely deconstruct the mix of the song. Eno initially disapproved, but was satisfied after hearing the changes. The editing of the track was finalised on 10 July, and the Edge later said he felt his effort to put extra work into the song "paid off".  It was released with the title "Slug" on 7 November 1995, as the second track on the Passengers album Original Soundtracks 1; out of the fourteen tracks on the album, it is one of six tracks to feature vocals.  Details of the song's recording sessions were documented in Eno's 1996 book, A Year with Swollen Appendices.

As the compositions on Original Soundtracks 1 were written as film soundtrack music, each track is associated with a specific film in the album's liner notes, which were written by Eno.  Four of the fourteen tracks are associated with real films, while "Slug" is credited as having been written for a fictional German film of the same name, directed by "Peter von Heineken" (a reference to U2 manager Paul McGuinness). The liner notes describe the plot of Slug as the story of a young car mechanic who aspires to attract the attention of a cashier by staging a robbery and pretending to be the hero. However, the "robbers" decide to abandon the scheme and commit an actual robbery, causing a shootout where the cashier accidentally shoots a security guard and is arrested, and the mechanic must find a way to get her released from prison.

Composition and lyrics

"Slug" runs for 4:41 and features a synthesizer rhythm and guitar harmonics laid over a drum track.  Jon Pareles of The New York Times described the song's sound as a mix of "shimmering echoed guitars with swampy electronic rhythms". Vocals are sung by Bono in a murmured voice, which begin 1:45 into the song.  The lyrics are sung in a list-like format, and consist of 19 lines, most of which begin with the words "Don't want"; the song's title is included in the lyrics "Don't want to be a slug". The line "Don't want what I deserve" was written by Bono with a sense of "ironic, self-deprecatory humour". The end result is a depiction of celebration set against the thoughts of a desolate soul, as echoed in the closing verse "Don't want to change the frame / Don't want to be a pain / Don't want to stay the same", with an undercurrent of confusion regarding the differences between love and faith.

The lyrics were written in five minutes and are derived from U2's experience in Shinjuku. Bono has compared the lyrics to those in U2's 1991 song "Tryin' to Throw Your Arms Around the World", as both depict the nightlife of a city. Lyrics were also inspired by the presence of the yakuza in Shinjuku; the group saw gang members with amputated fingers as punishment for their misbehaviour, which Bono has described as a "very, very surreal" experience. He has said that "Slug" was about avoiding harmful mistakes, stating "we all play with things we shouldn't play with".

Reception

"Slug" received positive feedback from critics and was praised as one of the best tracks from the album. Shortly following its release, Tony Fletcher wrote in Newsweek that it is one of the album's "instantly rewarding songs" and that Bono's vocals show "genuine tenderness".  The Orange County Register listed "Slug" as one of the best songs on the album, describing it as a "dreamy" track, and The Age and The Dominion both stated that the song features Bono providing his best vocals.  Jim DeRogatis of Rolling Stone described "Slug" as one of the album's most engaging tracks, commenting that it could have been an outtake from Zooropa because of Bono's "minimal crooning over skeletal backing tracks".

In retrospective reviews, Pitchfork wrote that "Slug" is the high point of the album, featuring a "beautiful, slow-motion groove", and Slate praised the experimental nature of the song, calling it "lovely and melodic".  Uncut reviewer Alastair McKay described the melody as "clockwork" while noting that Eno's "yen for melodic simplicity" was evident. In an otherwise critical review of Original Soundtracks 1, Irvin Tan of Sputnikmusic commented that "Slug" is one of several "strangely beautiful numbers" from the album, and that its "attempt at creating an overarching time/place set actually comes off quite well".  Hot Press editor Niall Stokes said "the song has a genuinely reflective quality and it underlines the fact that, some 15 years on since the release of their debut album Boy, U2 are still running."  The song was featured on Stereogum list of "The 31 Best U2 Non-Album Tracks", which claims the song is unlike any other track that U2 has recorded, describing it as a "hauntingly beautiful entry in U2's canon".

Personnel

Passengers
Bono – vocals
The Edge – guitar
Adam Clayton – bass guitar
Larry Mullen Jr. – drums, percussion
Brian Eno – synthesizers

Technical
Brian Eno – mixing, sequencing
Danton Supple – audio engineering
Rob Kirwan – audio engineering (assistance)

References
Footnotes

Bibliography

External links
Original Soundtracks 1 on U2.com

1995 songs
Ambient songs
Experimental rock songs
Passengers songs
Song recordings produced by Brian Eno
Songs written by Adam Clayton
Songs written by Bono
Songs written by Brian Eno
Songs written by the Edge
Songs written by Larry Mullen Jr.
Visual music